St. Luke's Protestant Episcopal Church may refer to:

in the United States
(by state)
St. Luke's Protestant Episcopal Church (Sea Cliff, New York), a historic church in New York
St. Luke's Protestant Episcopal Church (Seaford, Delaware), a historic church in Delaware
St. Luke's Protestant Episcopal Church (Brooklyn, New York), also known as Church of St. Luke and St. Matthew, a historic church in New York

See also
 St. Luke's Episcopal Church (disambiguation)
 St. Luke's Church (disambiguation)